Sarhadd or Sarhad, also known as Sarhad-e Broghil or Sarhad-e Wakhan, is a village in the Wakhan District of Badakhshan Province, Afghanistan.

It is inhabited by Wakhi people. The village lies at the end of a rough road from Ishkashim, and just to the north of the Broghil Pass.

The population of the village was reported in 2003 at around 548 people.

Climate
Sarhadd has a tundra climate (Köppen: ET) with brief, cool summers and long, bitterly cold winters.

See also
Valleys of Afghanistan

References

External links 
Satellite map at Maplandia.com 

Populated places in Badakhshan Province
Wakhan